Events in the year 1629 in India.

Events
Death of Jehangir and accession to the Mughal throne of Shah Jahan (born 1592, deposed 1658, died 1666)

References

 
India
Years of the 17th century in India